United Nations Security Council resolution 1109, adopted unanimously on 28 May 1997, after considering a report by the Secretary-General Kofi Annan regarding the United Nations Disengagement Observer Force (UNDOF), the Council noted its efforts to establish a durable and just peace in the Middle East.

The resolution called upon the parties concerned to immediately implement Resolution 338 (1973). It renewed the mandate of the Observer Force for another six months until 30 November 1997 and requested that the Secretary-General submit a report on the situation at the end of that period.

The Secretary-General's report noted that while no violations of the ceasefire had occurred and the situation between Israel and Syria remained calm, there were still restrictions on the freedom of movement of UNDOF in some areas.

See also
 Arab–Israeli conflict
 Golan Heights
 Israel–Syria relations
 List of United Nations Security Council Resolutions 1101 to 1200 (1997–1998)

References

External links
 
Text of the Resolution at undocs.org

 1109
 1109
 1109
1997 in Israel
1997 in Syria
May 1997 events